The 2019 Fort Worth mayoral election took place on May 4, 2019, to elect the mayor of Fort Worth, Texas. The election was officially non-partisan.

Betsy Price, who was serving her fourth term, ran for reelection. Deborah Peoples, the chair of the Tarrant County Democratic Party, ran as a challenger. 

Betsy Price handily won re-election with just under 56% of the vote. Price won a record fifth term as mayor of Fort Worth.

Results

References

Fort Worth mayoral
Fort Worth
2019
Non-partisan elections